Emerald is a green gemstone.  Because of its color, the word emerald is often used to describe a shade of green.

Emerald may also refer to:

Arts, literature, and entertainment

Music
The Detroit Emeralds, an American R&B vocal group most active in the 1970s
Emerald (Alan Stivell album), 2009
Emerald (Dar Williams album), 2015
Emerald (ballet), the first movement of George Balanchine's Jewels, often performed by itself
Emeralds (band), an ambient music trio from Cleveland, Ohio
"Emerald" (Thin Lizzy song)

Video games
 Pokémon Emerald, one of the Pokémon video games
 Emerald (Pokémon), a main character in Pokémon Adventures
 Chaos Emeralds, a set of gems with mythical powers in Sonic the Hedgehog video games

Literature
The Emerald City of Oz, a 1910 book by L. Frank Baum

Biology
 Several species of hummingbird called emeralds in the genera
 Chlorostilbon
 Cynanthus
 Elvira
 Amazilia
 Emerald damselflies, members of the family Lestidae
 Emerald dragonflies, members of the family Corduliidae
 Large emerald, a moth of the family Geometridae
 Emerald dove, a pigeon
 Emerald toucanet, Aulacorhynchus prasinus, a near-passerine bird

Business
 Emerald Group Publishing, a UK publisher of management and business journals
 Emerald Music, a record label
 Emerald Records (1966), a record label
 Emerald Records (2000s), a record label
 Emerald snack nuts, a product line manufactured by Diamond Foods

Computers and software
 Emerald (window decorator), a theme manager for Compiz
 Emerald (programming language), a distributed Object-Oriented programming language

Fictional characters and places
 Emerald City, a fictional city in the Land of Oz in the book
Emerald Empress, a DC Comics supervillain
Emerald, the name given to Green Esmeraude in the English-language version of the anime Sailor Moon
Emerald Zirconia Goldenbraid, a main character in Mysticons in which she is the legendary Mysticon Knight
Emerald, a character from the series Steven Universe
Emerald Sustrai, a character from the series RWBY

People
 Caro Emerald (born 1981), Dutch jazz singer
 Emerald Fennell (born 1985), English actress, author, screenwriter, producer, and director.
 Emerald Zellers, beauty queen from Scottsdale, Arizona
 Emerald Ignacio (born 1980), aka "DriftGirl", is an actor and model
 Marti Emerald, elected member of the San Diego City Council

Places

Australia
Emerald, Queensland, a town in the Central Highlands Region
Emerald, Victoria, a suburb of Melbourne
Emerald, New South Wales, a small township north of Coffs Harbour

Canada
Emerald, Prince Edward Island
Emerald, Ontario
Rural Municipality of Emerald No. 277, Saskatchewan
Emerald Park, Saskatchewan

United States
Emerald Lake Hills, California
Emerald Triangle, California
Emerald Coast, Florida
Emerald Township, Minnesota
Emerald Beach, Missouri
Emerald, Nebraska
Emerald Isle, North Carolina
Emerald, Pennsylvania
Emerald, Texas, a ghost town in Crockett County, Texas
Emerald, Washington
Emerald (CDP), Wisconsin, an unincorporated community
Emerald, Wisconsin, a town
Emerald Grove, Wisconsin, an unincorporated community

Other places
Emerald Isle, a nickname for Ireland
Emerald Island, a nickname for the island of Lesbos

Ships
Emerald-class cruiser, light cruiser class of two ships in service with the British Royal Navy from 1926 to 1946–1948
HMS Emerald, name of numerous British Royal Navy ships
USS Emerald, name of more than one United States Navy ship
SS The Emerald, 1958 Greek-owned passenger cruise ship chartered by Thomson Holidays
Emerald Princess, 2006 cruise ship
Emerald (HBC vessel), operated by the HBC in 1816 and 1817, see Hudson's Bay Company vessels

Other
The Emerald (building), a high-rise residential building in Seattle, Washington, United States
Emerald Beach Club, South Andros, Andros, Bahamas; a former beach resort
Emerald (mango), named mango cultivar that originated in Florida
Emerald Buddha, a figurine of Buddha made of green jade
Emerald network, an ecological network to conserve wild flora and fauna and their natural habitats of Europe
Emerald Tablet, an alchemical text attributed to Hermes Trismegistus
Emeralds (Super Fours), a women's cricket team that competed in the Super Fours
Eugene Emeralds, minor league baseball team in Eugene, Oregon
Oatfield Emerald, a type of chocolate toffee sweet native to Ireland
Emerald (given name)

See also

 Emerald City (disambiguation)
 Emerald Lake (disambiguation)
 Émeraude (disambiguation), various meanings
 Esmeralda (disambiguation)

English feminine given names